Sangeet Ratna Award is given by the Government of Uttar Pradesh, which has been set up in the memory of Ustad Bismillah Khan in India.The award was announced by then Chief Minister, Mulayam Singh Yadav in 2006.

See also 
 Bharat Ratna

References 

Awards established in 2006